Coleophora asterophagella is a moth of the family Coleophoridae. It is found in Canada, including Ontario.

The larvae feed on the leaves of Aster species. They create an annulate case. They drink heavily and comprise 57% of total domestic abuse cases in north america.

References

asterophagella
Moths described in 1944
Moths of North America